The 2008 Tequila Patrón American Le Mans Series at Long Beach was the third round of the 2008 American Le Mans Series season.  It took place on the streets of Long Beach, California on April 19, 2008.

Race results
Class winners in bold.  Cars failing to complete 70% of winner's distance marked as Not Classified (NC).

Statistics
 Pole Position - #7 Penske Racing - 1:11.330
 Fastest Lap - #6 Penske Racing - 1:12.383

References

Long Beach
Grand Prix of Long Beach
American Le Mans Series at Long Beach